The AFC first round of 1990 FIFA World Cup qualification was decided by a draw which was conducted in Zürich, Switzerland, on 12 December 1987. The round began on 6 January 1989 and finished on 29 July 1989.

The top countries in each group at the end of the stage progressed to the final round, where the six remaining teams competed for the two places at the final tournament.

Format
The Maldives withdrew before the final draw, leaving 25 teams to be divided into 6 groups of 4 or 5 teams each. The teams played against each other on a home-and-away basis, except in Group 4, where the teams played against each other twice but all games were held in South Korea and Singapore. The group winners would advance to the Final Round. Bahrain, India, and South Yemen withdrew after the draw, meaning a total of 22 teams competed.

Groups

Group 1

Group 2

Group 3

Group 4

Group 5

Group 6

External links
 Asian Zone at FIFA.com

1